There are over 20,000 Grade II* listed buildings in England. This article comprises a list of these buildings in the county of Wiltshire.

List

|}

See also
List of Grade I listed buildings in Wiltshire

Notes

External links